The Visakhapatnam Metropolitan Region Development Authority (VMRDA) is the urban planning agency of Visakhapatnam in the Indian state of Andhra Pradesh. It was formed by expanding the existing Visakhapatnam Urban Development Authority (VUDA). It was set up for the purposes of planning, co-ordination, supervising, promoting and securing the planned development of the Visakhapatnam Metropolitan Region. It coordinates the development activities of the municipal corporations, municipalities and other local authorities.

Jurisdiction 

Under the jurisdiction of VMRDA, the Visakhapatnam Metropolitan Region (VMR), comprises, Visakhapatnam city and the districts of Vizianagaram,Visakhapatnam and Anakapalli.

The below table list the urban areas of VMR:

Developing Projects 
The Future Developing Projects by VMRDA given below.

 Mudasarlova Park.
 Visakhapatnam Metro.
 Heli Tourism.
Beach corridor from Visakhapatnam to Bhogapuram.
 Smart Cities Mission.
 Integrated museum and tourism complex.

Expansion 
13 mandals of the Visakhapatnam district have been brought under the Visakhapatnam Metropolitan Region Development Authority (VMRDA).  Visakhapatnam District is made up of a total of 46 mandals. 22 were already under VMRDA and the Integrated Tribal Development Agency (ITDA) takes care of 11 mandals.

On 23 March 2021, VMRDA has taken the remaining 13 non-Agency mandals under its jurisdiction, taking its total to 52 mandals. This decision comes in light of the rapid urbanisation towards the western corridors of Visakhapatnam city. As per sources, this inclusion of mandals is expected to reduce pressure on the urban infrastructure of the city, ensuring planned development in the fringe areas.

Narsipatnam, Rolugunta, Chodavaram, and Madugula are a few of the 13 mandals. According to sources, these mandals are said to have the potential to develop as urban areas.

See also
Greater Visakhapatnam Municipal Corporation

References

Organisations based in Visakhapatnam
Government of Visakhapatnam
State urban development authorities of India
Urban development authorities of Andhra Pradesh
Uttarandhra
2018 establishments in Andhra Pradesh
Government agencies established in 2018